Manaus International Airport – Eduardo Gomes  is the airport located  north of downtown Manaus, Brazil, operated by Vinci Airports. It is named after Brazilian politician and military figure Air Marshal Eduardo Gomes (1896–1981).

History

Manaus International Airport replaced Ponta Pelada Airport as the main public airport of Manaus in 1976. Ponta Pelada was then renamed Manaus Air Force Base and began handling exclusively military operations.

The construction of the airport began in 1972 and it was commissioned on March 31, 1976 by a domestic flight operated by a Boeing 727-100 of Serviços Aéreos Cruzeiro do Sul. At the time it was the most modern airport in Brazil and the first one to operate with jet bridges. Though originally planned to be named Supersonic Airport of Manaus, its official name was changed to Eduardo Gomes by the law 5.967 of 11 December 1973.

The airport has two passenger terminal buildings. Passenger Terminal 1 handles all domestic and international flights and Passenger Terminal 2, opened on March 12, 1985, handles general aviation. Furthermore, the airport has three cargo terminals, opened in 1976, 1980 and 2004. Cargo Terminals 1 and 2 handle goods for export and Cargo Terminal 3 for import.

On 31 August 2009, Infraero unveiled a BRL793.5 million (US$316.1 million; EUR292.2 million) investment plan to upgrade Eduardo Gomes International Airport focusing on the preparations for the 2014 FIFA World Cup which were held in Brazil, Manaus being one of the venue cities. The investment comprised enlargement of apron and existing runway and enlargement and renovation of the passenger terminal. 

In terms of cargo handled, Manaus is the third-busiest in Brazil, behind São Paulo-Guarulhos and Campinas.

The Brazilian Integrated Air Traffic Control and Air Defense Center section 4 (Cindacta IV) is located in the vicinity of the airport.

Previously operated by Infraero, on April 7, 2021 Vinci SA won a 30-year concession to operate the airport.

Airlines and destinations

Passenger

Cargo

Statistics

Accidents and incidents
21 April 1983:  three Libyan Air Force Il-76TDs and a C-130 landed at Manaus airport, after one of the Il-76s developed some technical problems while crossing the Atlantic Ocean. The aircraft were then searched by the Brazilian authorities.  While their cargo was officially declared as medical supplies, the planes were carrying the 17 Aero L-39 Albatros jets, together with arms and parachutes, destined for Nicaragua. The cargo was impounded, while the transports were permitted to return to Libya.
6 March 1991: a TABA Embraer EMB 110 Bandeirante flying to Manaus was hijacked near São Gabriel da Cachoeira by 3 persons.
15 December 1994: a TABA Embraer EMB 110 Bandeirante en route from Carauari and Tefé to Manaus was hijacked by two Colombian citizens. The passengers were released in the proximity of Tabatinga and the aircraft was flown to Colombia. The crew was released at the Brazilian Embassy in Bogotá.
14 May 2004: Rico Linhas Aéreas Flight 4815 operated by the Embraer EMB 120ER Brasília registration PT-WRO, en route from São Paulo de Olivença and Tefé to Manaus crashed in the forest at about 18 nm from Manaus. All 33 passengers and crew died.

See also
List of airports in Brazil

References

External links

Airports in Amazonas (Brazilian state)
Airports established in 1976
Manaus
1976 establishments in Brazil